Microvisk Ltd is a medical device company based in North Wales and Oxfordshire, UK, that was founded in 2004.  It is a member of the Welsh Optoelectronics Forum - a group of companies specialising in optoelectronics which developed out of Pilkington’s glass manufacturing operations.

The company is funded through a mixture of private and venture capital investors, and has established collaboration with the Royal Liverpool and Broadgreen University Hospitals NHS Trust. The UK clinical trials have been facilitated by Trustech - part of the NHS Institute for Innovation and Improvement’s network of hubs across England.

The site at St Asaph, Wales handles sales and shipping, overall project management, clinical chemistry, data analysis, component production and administration. Research into sensors and micro-electromechanical technology is conducted at the site at Chipping Warden, Oxfordshire, along with sensor and electronics development.  It has developed a MEMs based microviscometer for the prothrombin time test.

In 2006 the company expanded its premises and undertook a clinical trial  with the Royal London Hospital, which gave excellent results in comparison with a universally recognised laboratory-based industry standard. Initial research was carried out at the Rutherford Appleton Laboratory in Oxfordshire.

In 2008 the company increased staff levels and moved to a new facility with custom-built laboratories and additional office space, allowing future expansion.

Two products currently in development include CoagMax and CoagLite, point of care INR monitors for home and professional use.

References

Medical technology companies of the United Kingdom
Manufacturing companies of Wales
Companies established in 2006